Mitch Toryanski  (born May 1, 1958) was a Republican  member of the Idaho Senate representing District 18 from 2010 to 2012. Toryanski is married to Kim Wherry Toryanski and is a father to three children.

Early life and career
Toryanski is an alumnus of the United States Military Academy, the United States Army War College and The American University. He also studied Russian at the Defense Language Institute.

Toryanski served in the United States Army from 1976 to 1992, the United States Army Reserve from 1992 to 1996, and the Idaho Army National Guard from 1996 to 2010 retiring at the rank of colonel.

As a lawyer he has worked in private practice and served as an Idaho deputy Attorney General (2005-2010) and as a deputy Ada County prosecutor.

From 2017-2020, Toryanski served as Regence's Director of Government and Regulatory Affairs.

Elections

2010 

Idaho Senate seat vacated by Kate Kelly.

Toryanski defeated Robert N. Lauritsen and Dean E. Sorensen with 46.6% of the vote in the Republican Primary.

Toryanski defeated Democratic state representative Branden Durst in the general election by 103 votes.

2012 

Toryanski was unopposed in the Republican Primary.

Toryanski lost to Branden Durst in the general election earning 46.5% of the vote.

2014 

In December 2013, Toryanski announced his campaign to run for Idaho Secretary of State.

He, Phil McGrane, and Evan Frasure lost to Lawerence Denney in the Republican primary, with Toryanski getting 15.7% of the vote.

Committees 
Toryanski was a member of the following committees:
 Joint Finance and Appropriations
Finance
 Education

Organizations 
He is a member of:
 Veterans of Foreign Wars 
American Legion
 Professional Conduct Board of the Idaho State Bar Association
 Ada County Lincoln Day Association (Past President 2006)

References

External links 
 Voter guide - Mitch Toryanski
 Mitch Toryanski For Idaho Secretary of State - Online | Wayback Machine

1958 births
Republican Party Idaho state senators
Living people
People from Boise, Idaho
Politicians from Saint Paul, Minnesota
United States Military Academy alumni
American University alumni
Military personnel from Minnesota